Bucculatrix transversella is a moth in the family Bucculatricidae. It was described by Aristide Caradja in 1920. It is found in Russia.

References

Arctiidae genus list at Butterflies and Moths of the World of the Natural History Museum

Bucculatricidae
Moths described in 1920
Taxa named by Aristide Caradja
Moths of Asia